South Korean-based girl group AOA have released three studio albums, one compilation album, six extended plays, five single albums, nineteen singles (including 14 digital singles in Korean and five physical singles in Japan), and four promotional singles.

Formed by FNC Entertainment, AOA debuted in July 2012 with the release of their first single album, Angels' Story, and its single Elvis. Three months later, they released a second single album, Wanna Be, in October 2012. In 2013, they released two more single albums, Moya (as a sub-unit AOA Black) and Red Motion, in July and October respectively. A fifth single album titled Miniskirt was released in January 2014, which spawned the first Top 20 single on the Gaon Singles Chart for the group. In 2014, AOA returned twice more times with the release their first and second EPs, Short Hair and Like a Cat, in June and November respectively. The third EP, Heart Attack (2015), becomes the group's best-selling album in Korean with total sales of more than 47,000 physical copies. AOA's fourth EP titled Good Luck, which was released in May 2016, sold more than 40,000 physical copies as of December 2016. In January 2017, AOA released their debut Korean studio album titled Angel's Knock. One year hiatus after the member Choa's departure, the group returned with their fifth EP, Bingle Bangle, released on May 28, 2018.  AOA returned with their sixth EP, New Moon, released on November 26, 2019.

A Japanese version of AOA's breakout hit, "Miniskirt," was released as their debut Japanese-language single in October 2014 and peaked at number 13 on the Oricon Singles Chart. AOA then released their debut Japanese studio album titled Ace of Angels one year later in October 2015. The Japanese versions of "Like a Cat" and "Heart Attack" were also released as singles, reaching number four and number six respectively on the Oricon Singles Chart. Their fourth and first original Japanese single, "Give Me the Love," featuring vocals of Takanori Nishikawa was released in April 2016. AOA's fifth Japanese single, "Good Luck," was released in August 2016. In November 2016, AOA released their second Japanese studio album titled Runway.

Albums

Studio albums

Compilation albums

Extended plays

Singles

As lead artist

Promotional singles

Other charted songs

Videography

DVDs
 2014: AOA's Hot Summer Photobook
 2015: 1st Concert in Japan "ANGELS WORLD 2015 ~Oh BOY ACADEMY~" Digest
 2016: AOA Summer Concert in Japan 〜Angels World 2016〜 at Tokyo Dome City Hall

Music videos

Notes

References

Discography
Discographies of South Korean artists
K-pop music group discographies